The Kemper Building is a 522 ft (159m) tall skyscraper in the Loop area of Downtown Chicago, Illinois. It was completed 1962 and has 41 floors. When it was completed, it was the tallest marble-clad office building in Chicago. In March 2018, the building's namesake tenant Kemper Corporation announced it was leaving the building for the nearby Aon Center.

See also
List of tallest buildings in Chicago

References

External links

Skyscraper office buildings in Chicago
Office buildings completed in 1962
1962 establishments in Illinois